The Canon EOS-1D is a professional digital single-lens reflex camera launched in November 2001 as part of Canon's flagship EOS-1 series. It was the first digital camera in the EOS-1 line, succeeding Canon's final flagship film camera, the 1V. It was also the first professional-level digital camera developed and released entirely by Canon, the previous D2000 being a collaborative effort with Kodak. It has a 1.3x crop factor with a  image sensor sourced . The camera shares its body design with the Canon EOS-1V 35mm camera (with the additional battery grip attached). It was complemented by the slower, higher-resolution 1Ds in 2002 and succeeded by the 1D Mark II in April 2004.

Features

The 1D was seen as a major breakthrough for a professional news and sports camera after its predecessors, the Canon EOS DCS series and EOS D2000, which had both been produced in co-operation with Kodak. In comparison with those cameras, the 1D had faster image processing speed, much cleaner high ISO speeds, realtime JPEG encoding, and it could shoot at eight frames per second, something which was then unheard of in the world of digital cameras. In addition to offering a wide range of image settings, it had many features that are not present in its successors:
 Features a CCD sensor instead of a CMOS sensor.
 The only Canon SLR (film or digital) to have an X-sync speed of up to 1/500 of a second.
 The only Canon SLR (film or digital) to have a shutter speed of up to 1/16000 of a second.
 The only PC connectivity was provided via an IEEE 1394 (FireWire) connection, as USB was still only on version 1.1, which was far too slow for transferring large amounts of high-resolution image files.
  While not a feature, it was the only 1D Pro Digital camera from Canon to have no magnify in playback.

The 1D also included a microphone for voice annotation. This feature had been present in the earlier DCS and D2000, and was retained on later models. It was added to the 5D line on the 5D Mark II, though this was mainly intended to be used with the camera's video recording mode. In addition the camera used an externally mounted white balance sensor, another feature which had earlier appeared on the D2000.

The 1D is the first Canon DSLR to store 9,999 images to one folder - a feature that eventually became the standard for subsequent Canon products (from its compact point and shoots to its DSLR cameras).

References

External links

EOS-1D at the Canon Camera Museum
www.dpreview.com's Canon 1D Review
www.imaging-resource.com's Canon EOS-1D Review
www.luminous-landscape.com Canon EOS-1D, A Reviewer's Notebook
www.luminous-landscape.com Canon EOS 1D Digital, A formal Review
www.digitaljournalist.org The EOS-1D Digital Camera

1D
Cameras introduced in 2001